Cole Español is a 1958 studio album by Nat King Cole to the Latin market, arranged by Nelson Riddle. One of three Spanish themed albums that Cole recorded, it was followed by A Mis Amigos (1959) and by More Cole Español in 1962. The orchestral music was recorded in Havana, Cuba, and Cole added his vocals in June in Los Angeles, California. However the song  "Tú, mi delirio" is instrumental; Cole overdubbed piano, rather than vocals to this track. The album was later reissued as Español and More, Vol. 1. The album was inducted into the Latin Grammy Hall of Fame in 2007. The album reached #12 on the Billboard Magazine LP chart.

Track listing 
 "Cachito" (Consuelo Velázquez) – 2:50
 "María Elena" (Lorenzo Barcelata, Bob Russell) – 2:42
 "Quizás, quizás, quizás (Perhaps, Perhaps, Perhaps)" (Osvaldo Farrés, Joe Davis) – 2:46
 "Las mañanitas" (traditional) – 2:57
 "Acércate más (Come Closer to Me)" (Osvaldo Farrés, Al Stewart) – 2:49
 "El bodeguero (Grocer's Cha-Cha)" (Richard Egües) – 2:25
 "Arrivederci Roma" (Renato Rascel, Pietro Garinei, Sandro Giovannini, Carl Sigman) – 2:46
 "Noche de ronda" (Agustín Lara) – 2:34
 "Tú, mi delirio" (César Portillo de la Luz) – 2:36
 "Te quiero, dijiste (Magic Is the Moonlight)" (María Grever, Charles Pasquale) – 2:41
 "Adelita" (traditional) – 2:10

Personnel

Performance 
 Nat King Cole – vocal, piano on "Tú, mi delirio"
 Nelson Riddle – arranger, conductor
 Armando Romeu Jr. – arranger, conductor
 Armando de Sequeira Romeu – drums
 Cuarteto Rivero - backing vocals on "Acércate Más"

Certifications

References 

1958 albums
Spanish-language albums
Nat King Cole albums
Albums arranged by Nelson Riddle
Capitol Records albums
Albums conducted by Nelson Riddle
Latin Grammy Hall of Fame Award recipients
Latin music albums by American artists
Albums recorded at Capitol Studios